Kamares (Greek: Καμάρες) is a village and the main port for the island of Sifnos, Greece. Kamares is situated in the western side of the island on a natural harbor. The village has a large beach with many restaurants and hotels. The buildings in Kamares form a U-shape around the bay, with most restaurants and shops being directly on the water, and typically the hotels and houses on the hill above them. Visitors to the island arrive via the ferry terminal in the harbor; nearby bus service connects Kamares to the other villages of Sifnos.

Gallery

References

External links
Municipality of Sifnos (in Greek) 

 
Mediterranean port cities and towns in Greece
Populated places in Milos (regional unit)